Nyunzu Airport  is an airport serving the town of Nyunzu in Tanganyika Province, Democratic Republic of the Congo.

See also

Transport in the Democratic Republic of the Congo
List of airports in the Democratic Republic of the Congo

References

External links
 Nyunzu
 HERE Maps - Nyunzu
 OpenStreetMap - Nyunzu
 OurAirports - Nyunzu

Airports in Tanganyika Province